Zico may refer to:
 Zico (footballer) (born 1953), born Arthur Antunes Coimbra, Brazilian footballer and coach 
 Zico Soccer, a video game
 Zico Football Center, a sports complex in Rio de Janeiro, Brazil
 Zico (footballer, born 1966), born Milton Antonio Nunes Niemet, Brazilian footballer and coach
 Zico (rapper) or Woo Ji-ho (born 1992), South Korean rapper
 ZICO (beverage), a brand of coconut water

People with the given name
 Zico Bailey (born 2000), American soccer player
 Zico Doe (fl. from 1990), Liberian footballer
 Zico Luzinho Ingles Casimiro or Luzinho (born 1985), East Timorese footballer
 Zico Otieno (Zedekiah Otieno, born 1968), Kenyan footballer
 Zico Phillips (born 1991), Barbadian footballer  
 Zico Rumkabu (born 1989), Indonesian footballer
 Zico Senamuang or Kiatisuk Senamuang (born 1973), Thai footballer and coach
 Zico Waeytens (born 1991), Belgian cyclist

See also
 Zito (disambiguation)
 Zico Chain, a British rock band
 Zeiko Lewis (born 1994), Bermudian footballer